The Impossible Dreamers were a 1980s new-wave band that had a major club hit with their 12" single "Spin", before signing for RCA Records, where they were produced by Johnny Marr (the Smiths). The Imps (as they were nicknamed) started off as several friends at Exeter University (c1980). By the time of their first RCA single, "This House Built On Sand", the band were: Nick Waterhouse (gtr, vox)/Caroline Radcliffe (vox, oboe)/Justin Adams (gtr)/Fred Hood (drums). The band toured extensively (originally supporting bands including Kid Creole & The Coconuts and Bad Manners), and were courted by the NME (January 1983) and many other magazines.

The quartet stayed together until 1987/8, before going their separate ways. Justin Adams is now a respected guitarist who plays (and produces) with the likes of Robert Plant. Fred Hood, a close acquaintance of Johnny Marr, has also been the drummer/writer/producer for The Pretenders and Moodswings, where he is often referred to as James FT Hood.

Caroline Radcliffe is one of the musicians on the Lilac Time's second album Paradise Circus. She co-wrote songs with Nick Duffy and was part of his project "Bait". The Lilac Time tried to release a double album called Tree in 1989, but Fontana declined. So, the Lilacs made Paradise Circus and the rest of the songs were released as BAIT. Most of these tracks now feature on Lilac Time CD releases.

Together with Nick Waterhouse, Caroline organises the "Acoustic Plus" music events in Frome and they play together as Three Corners. In 2008, Radcliffe and Waterhouse released their first new music together since the last Impossible Dreamers release in 1987. Under the name "Three Corners" they released a new CD Stone Age Genes in the Digital Era, a limited edition release on their own label (a merciful release). The follow-up CD, entitled Express, was released in November 2010, for which the band name became "3corners".

Discography
 Books Books Books (EP single, Merciful Release MR1, 1980)
 "Spin / Life on Earth" (12" single, 100ThingsToDo MR5, 1982)
 "This House Built on Sand" (single, RCA Arcadia iD001, 1984)
 "August Avenue" (12" single, RCA PB40349, 1985)
 "Running for Cover" (single, RCA Arcadia CARO 1, 1986)
 "I Had Love in My Hands" (single, RCA Eurodisc LOVE 1, 1987)
 "Say Goodbye to No One" (single, RCA BCA 500, 1987)
 Ready in the Rhythm Section (university album release shared with The Syndromes, 1981).

References

External links
 The Impossible Dreamers fan website

English new wave musical groups